Vladimir Sevryugin (15 June 1924 – 26 January 1998) was a sport shooter who competed for the Soviet Union. He won a bronze medal in 100 metre running deer at the 1956 Summer Olympics in Melbourne.

References

1924 births
1998 deaths
Soviet male sport shooters
Olympic shooters of the Soviet Union
Olympic bronze medalists for the Soviet Union
Shooters at the 1952 Summer Olympics
Shooters at the 1956 Summer Olympics
Olympic medalists in shooting
Medalists at the 1956 Summer Olympics